The Goya Award for Best Editing (Premio Goya al mejor montaje) is one of the Goya Awards, the principal national film award of Spain. It has been awarded since the first edition in 1986.

Film editors that have won multiple times are José Salcedo, Pablo González del Amo and Pablo Blanco Somoza, with three wins each.

Winners and nominees

1980s

1990s

2000s

2010s

2020s

References

Bibliography

External links
Official site

1986 establishments in Spain
Awards established in 1986
Film editing awards
Editing